Pesticide drift refers to the unintentional diffusion of pesticides and the potential negative effects of pesticide application, including off-target contamination due to spray drift as well as runoff from plants or soil. This can lead to damage in human health, environmental contamination, and property damage. Some pesticides are more likely to drift than others which can mean it is more harmful in some cases. For example, fumigants which are gaseous pesticides move easily through air and will drift if not contained. Some pesticides look like a cloud when they drift while others can be invisible and odorless.

Types
With placement (localised) spraying of broad spectrum pesticides, wind drift must be minimised, and considerable efforts have been made to quantify and control spray drift from hydraulic nozzles. Conversely, wind drift is also an efficient mechanism for moving droplets of an appropriate size range to their targets over a wide area with ultra-low volume (ULV) spraying.

Himel (1974) made a distinction between exo-drift (the transfer of spray out of the target area) and endo-drift, where the active ingredient (AI) in droplets falls into the target area, but does not reach the biological target. Endo-drift is volumetrically more significant and may therefore cause greater ecological contamination (e.g. where chemical pesticides pollute ground water).

Bystander exposure describes the event when individuals unintentionally come in contact with airborne pesticides. Bystanders include workers working in an area separate to the pesticide application area, individuals living in the surrounding areas of an application area, or individuals passing by fields as they are being treated with a pesticide.

Herbicide volatilisation
Herbicide volatilisation refers to evaporation or sublimation of a volatile herbicide. The effect of a gaseous chemical is lost at its intended place of application and may move downwind and affect other plants not intended to be affected causing crop damage. Herbicides vary in their susceptibility to volatilisation. Prompt incorporation of the herbicide into the soil may reduce or prevent volatilisation. Wind, temperature, and humidity also affect the rate of volatilisation, with humidity reducing it. 2,4-D and dicamba are commonly used chemicals that are known to be subject to volatilisation, but there are many others. The seriousness of crop injury caused by dicamba drift is increasingly being recognized. For example, the American Soybean Association and various land-grant universities are cooperating in the race to find ways to preserve the usability of dicamba while ending drift injury. Application of herbicides later in the season to protect herbicide-resistant genetically modified plants increases the risk of volatilisation as the temperature is higher and incorporation into the soil impractical.

Drift reduction methods 
To mitigate pesticide drift one will need to inspect their equipment. Before application, check to see if applicators, hoses, braces, springs, clamps, or any other equipment is bent, damaged, or clogged. If any of the equipment is damaged there is a higher chance for airflow to move droplets from the intended application site. When using ground boom sprayers be sure to set nozzle heights that are not too high above the intended crop. Nozzles that are too high above the target will lead to more airflow under the nozzle and carry droplets of pesticides to other unintended locations. Be aware of the weather when it is time to apply pesticides, if the outside temperature is hot, if there is lots of moisture in the air, or if it is windy, there is a higher chance for pesticide drift.

Public concern
Although there has been much public concern and research into spray drift, point source pollution (e.g. pesticides entering bodies of water following spillage of concentrate or rinsate) can also cause great environmental harm. Public concern for pesticide drift is not met with adequate regulatory response. Environmental justice advocates in California, for instance, consider moving up the scale of the discourse on pesticide drift by categorizing it as air pollution in order to receive attention from state environmental protection.

Farm workers and communities surrounding large farms are at a high risk of coming in contact with pesticides. The San Joaquin valley in California has seen numerous cases of illnesses resulting from exposure to pesticides through pesticide drift. Organizations such as the United Farm Workers Union have fought to implement legislation that would reduce and hold farmers accountable for pesticide drift. The California Department of Pesticide Regulation estimates that between 37 and 68% of pesticide illness among United States agricultural workers come as a result of pesticide drift.

Insecticides sprayed on crop fields can also have detrimental effects on non-human lifeforms that are important to the surrounding ecosystems like bees and other insects.

From 1998 to 2006, Environmental Health Perspectives found nearly 3,000 cases of pesticide drift; nearly half were workers on the fields treated with pesticides and 14% of cases were children under the age of 15.

Health concerns 
When pesticides drift, they can be inhaled or land on the skin and eyes. Symptoms include eye and nose irritation, runny nose, coughing, or rash. However, different pesticides can affect different body systems, inflicting different symptoms. Pesticide drift can result in more serious harm to one's health depending on how much and what type of pesticide is entering the body. Some pesticides cause little to no harm from low toxicity. Others can be very toxic and cause serious effects from little exposure. Yet, these pesticides are kept in tight control. Some pesticides, at significantly high exposures, can cause long-term health effects, including neurodevelopmental disorders in children, infertility and reproductive issues, cancer, pulmonary disease, and much more.

Regulations 
In 2001, the United States Environmental Protection Agency published a guidance to "manufacturers, formulators, and registrants of pesticide products" (EPA 2001) that stated the EPA's stance against pesticide drift as well as suggested product labelling practices. 

To try and reduce pesticide drift, the EPA is a part of several initiatives. The EPA has routine pesticide risk assessments to check potential drift impact on farmworkers living near or on fields where crops are grown, farmworkers, water sources, and the environment. The USDA and EPA are working together to examine new studies and how to improve scientific models to estimate the exposure, risk, and drift of pesticides. The EPA is also working with pesticide manufacturers to ensure labels are easy to read, contain the correct application process and DRT for that specific pesticide.

Current research 
Many things have previously been unknown regarding pesticide drift, including the direct health impacts on humans, effective ways to prevent pesticide drift (other than placing the responsibility on the farmer), and if the public should be concerned about their general health being impacted by pesticide drift. Recent research has come out that has shed light on a lot of different subject surrounding pesticide drift that have made it much easier to understand, and therefore easier to control.

One recent study has compared cytotoxicity and genotoxicity of rural agricultural residents to that of a control group and have found that individuals in agricultural areas are at risk for increased genotoxicity because of pesticide drift from farmers in the area.

Despite this alarming diagnosis, more research has also gone into finding effective ways to reduce the effects of pesticide drift without relying on compliance of the farmers. Farmers can struggle to walk the line between reducing pesticide drift and still being productive farmers, which has led to more research on alternative solutions for pesticide drift. Because of this, more effort has gone into developing specific pesticides that will not harm other (non-targeted) species, will decrease the distance pesticides can travel, and will decrease the amount of chemical taken in the air before landing on the target field.

In addition to monitoring what farmers are spraying, more research has gone into what weather conditions are the best to spray. Researchers understand that farmers cannot hold off spraying crops for extended periods of time, so research has gone into determining which is the best combination of the worst weather conditions to help optimize spray time while also maintaining the health of nearby aquatic ecosystems. One-way researchers have begun to do this is using computer programs to simulate the efficiency of the spray and reach of the spray drift. The program is being developed in hopes that it can one day be available to farmers to help maximize the positive effects of spraying for their crops, while minimizing negative effects on other ecosystems nearby.

See also 
Aerial application
Agricultural runoff
Environmental impact of agriculture
Environmental protection
Farmworker justice
Nonpoint source pollution
Pesticide application

References

Sources

Notes
 
Matthews G.A. (2006) Pesticides: Health, Safety and the Environment Blackwell, Oxford

External links 
 EarthJustice - health impacts of pesticide drift in rural farming community
 Pesticide Action Network North America (PANNA)- "Advancing alternatives to pesticides worldwide"
 International Pesticide Application Research Centre (IPARC)

Environmental effects of pesticides
Sustainable agriculture
Water pollution
Lawn care
Pesticides